North End or Northend may refer to:

Places

Canada
 North End, Hamilton, Ontario
 North End, Halifax, Nova Scotia
 North End St. Catharines, Ontario
 North End, Winnipeg, Manitoba
 North End, Yarmouth, Nova Scotia

South Africa
 North End, a suburb of East London, Eastern Cape 
 North End, Port Elizabeth, a suburb of Port Elizabeth

England 

 North End, Buckinghamshire
 Northend, Buckinghamshire
 North End, Croydon
 North End, Cumbria
 North End, Essex
 North End, Hampshire
 North End, Bexley, London
North End (Bexley ward)
 North End, Camden, formerly in the Municipal Borough of Hendon, London
 North End, Fulham, London
 Northend, Somerset
 Northend, Warwickshire

United States
 North End, a neighborhood of Hartford, Connecticut
 North End (Waterbury), Connecticut
 North End, Boston, Massachusetts
 North End, Springfield, Massachusetts
 North End, Detroit, Michigan
 North End, Saint Paul, Minnesota
 North End, Secaucus, New Jersey
 North End, Niagara Falls, New York

People
 Mary Harrod Northend (1850–1926), American writer

Sport
 North End AFC, a football club in New Zealand
 North End United, now Northern AFC, a football club in New Zealand
 Preston North End F.C., a football club in England

Other uses
 North End (band), an American band 1979–1982
 North End railway station, between Stratford-upon-Avon to Fenny Compton, England, in the 1870s
 North End tube station, London, England, never completed

See also

North End Historic District (disambiguation)